The R497 road is a regional road in Ireland which runs north-south from Nenagh, County Tipperary to the N24 in Tipperary Town.

Part of the road is known as the Anglesey Road, named after the Marquis of Anglesey who gave orders to have it built.

Just north of the village of Hollyford the road passes through Anglesey Road special area of conservation (site reference code 002125), a small site containing a variety of habitats and species found in unimproved upland grassland within the steep valley of the Multeen, a tributary of the River Suir. The main threat to the site is agricultural improvement and afforestation.

See also
Roads in Ireland
National primary road
National secondary road

References

Roads Act 1993 (Classification of Regional Roads) Order 2006 – Department of Transport

Regional roads in the Republic of Ireland
Roads in County Tipperary